Oidaematophorus downesi is a moth of the family Pterophoridae that is found in North America.

References

Oidaematophorini
Moths described in 1927
Moths of North America